Hussain Jabbar Zadegan (died July 1997) was an Iranian basketball player. He competed in the men's tournament at the 1948 Summer Olympics.

References

External links

Year of birth missing
1997 deaths
Iranian men's basketball players
Olympic basketball players of Iran
Basketball players at the 1948 Summer Olympics
Place of birth missing